The Trump Unity Bridge, also known as the Presidential Trump Unity Bridge and Trump Mobile, is a decorated float being driven by a Michigan resident throughout the United States, supporting the 45th President, Donald Trump. The float appeared at Trump's inauguration, the 2017 Women's March, and the Mother of All Rallies.

Description

To make it road mobile, the bridge was attached to a legally registered motorcycle trailer. It features American flags, signage including six-foot-tall letters spelling "Trump", a carved wooden eagle, and a replica of the Statue of Liberty.

The signs on the bridge include sayings such as "All Lives Matter", "American Culture", "Drain the swamp", "Hire American", and "Secure America's borders".

History
Rob Cortis, a resident of Livonia, Michigan, has owned the bridge since 1985.  The bridge was stolen from Cortis' Farmington Hills property in December 2014 and recovered in Belleville.

Cortis began driving the pro-Trump trailer in October 2016. He drove 20,000 miles by January 2017, and more than 40,000 miles by August 2017. The float was vandalized in Alexandria, Virginia, en route to the Mother of All Rallies in Washington, D.C.

In March 2019, Cortis interrupted an interfaith vigil in downtown Cleveland, Ohio commemorating the victims of the Christchurch mosque shootings by driving the float past twice while playing loud music.

On November 6, 2020, the float was impounded by Detroit Police for having an invalid license plate, and Cortis was taken into custody because of an outstanding warrant for a charge of disturbing the peace. Police warned him on Wednesday not to return to Detroit, but he did so anyway and was arrested.

On September 22, 2021, the float was involved in a three-vehicle crash in Flint, Michigan. Cortis was driving an ambulance hauling the Unity Bridge back to his home from an event opposing high school mask mandates when he hit another vehicle and spun into a telephone pole. There were no major injuries and there was no damage to the float.

Trump tour timeline
 October–November 2016: Michigan; Ohio
 December 12, 2016: Cleveland, Ohio
 January 17, 2017: New York City, New York
 January 21, 2017: Washington, D.C., for the inauguration of Donald Trump and 2017 Women's March
 March 2017: Indianapolis, Indiana; Ypsilanti Township, Michigan
 August 16, 2017: North Platte, Nebraska
 August 17, 2017: Lincoln, Nebraska
 August 18, 2017: Iowa City, Iowa
 September 15, 2017: Alexandria, Virginia
 September 16, 2017: Washington, D.C., for the Mother of All Rallies
May 10, 2018: Elkhart, IN, outside of a Donald Trump and Mike Pence rally at North Side Middle School
 July 13, 2019: Byron, MI, Byron Family Fun Day Parade
April 15, 2020: Lansing, MI, for Operation Gridlock
May 18, 2020: Owosso, MI, for an anti-lockdown rally in support of barber and business owner Karl Manke
August 28, 2020: Stolen and crashed by thief, Tulsa, OK
September 9, 2020: Alpena, MI.
January 29th, 2022: Detroit, MI.

See also

 Campaign bus
 Mobile billboard

References

External links
 

Cultural depictions of Donald Trump
Replicas of the Statue of Liberty
Vandalized works of art in the United States